Arthur W. Toga is an American neuroscientist and the director of the Laboratory of Neuro Imaging (LONI) and the Mark and Mary Stevens Neuroimaging and Informatics Institute within the Keck School of Medicine of the University of Southern California. He is also the Ghada Irani Chair in Neuroscience and provost professor of ophthalmology, neurology, psychiatry and the behavioral sciences, radiology and engineering.

He founded LONI in 1983 at the Washington University School of Medicine’s McDonnell Center for Higher Brain Function, and has done pioneering work on brain mapping and atlasing, global data sharing and neuroimaging informatics.

Toga has been repeatedly named one of “the world’s most influential scientific minds” and a highly cited researcher by Thomson Reuters.

Education 
Toga received his Bachelor of Science in psychology from the University of Massachusetts in Psychology (cum laude) in 1974. He obtained his Master of Science in Psychology/Neurosciences (cum laude) from St. Louis University in 1976 and his PhD in Psychology/Neurosciences from St. Louis University in 1978.

Academic career 
He began his academic career as an instructor of psychology at St. Louis University while completing his PhD, then began a postdoctoral fellowship at the Washington University School of Medicine’s Department of Neurology in 1978. By 1980, Toga began a research assistant professorship in neurology at Washington University, where he launched the Laboratory of Neuro Imaging in 1983. He also had a secondary appointment in the Department of Computer Sciences at Washington University. Google Scholar

In 1987, Toga began an associate professorship at the University of California, Los Angeles. During his time at UCLA, Toga was the assistant chairman for research affairs for the Department of Neurology, the director of LONI and the co-director of the Division of Brain Mapping within UCLA’s Neuropsychiatric Institute. Toga was promoted to professor in 1993 and university professor in 2009. He also received the honor of distinguished professor within the Department of Neurology in 2009. Toga served as the assistant dean for the David Geffen School of Medicine between 2008 and 2013 as well as the vice chair in the Department of Neurology. He was also the David Geffen Chair in Informatics from 2010 to 2013 and the assistant vice provost of informatics from 2010 to 2012.

In 2013, Toga moved to the University of Southern California, where he was named director of LONI and the USC Mark and Mary Stevens Neuroimaging and Informatics Institute. He is also a provost professor in the Keck School of Medicine of USC Departments of Ophthalmology, Neurology, Psychiatry and the Behavioral Sciences, Radiology and Engineering. In 2016, he was named the Ghada Irani Chair in Neuroscience.

References

Year of birth missing (living people)
Living people
American neuroscientists
University of Massachusetts alumni
Saint Louis University alumni
20th-century American psychologists
21st-century American psychologists